The International is a 2009 action thriller film directed by Tom Tykwer and written by Eric Warren Singer. Starring Clive Owen and Naomi Watts, the film follows an Interpol agent and an American district attorney who jointly investigate corruption within the IBBC, a fictional merchant bank based in Luxembourg. It serves organized crime and corrupt governments as a banker and as an arms broker. The bank's ruthless managers assassinate potential threats, including their own employees.

Inspired by the Bank of Credit and Commerce International (BCCI) scandal of the 1980s, the film raises concerns about how global finance affects international politics across the world. Production began in Berlin in September 2008, including the construction of a life-size replica of New York's Guggenheim Museum for the film's central shootout scene. The film opened the 59th Berlin International Film Festival on 5 February 2009. The Rotten Tomatoes critical consensus praised the action sequences and locations but criticized the plot.

Plot
Louis Salinger, an Interpol detective, and Eleanor Whitman, an Assistant District Attorney from Manhattan, are assigned to investigate the International Bank of Business and Credit (IBBC), which funds criminal activities such as money laundering, terrorism, arms trading, and the destabilization of governments. Salinger's and Whitman's investigation takes them to Milan, where the IBBC assassinates Umberto Calvini, an arms manufacturer and Italian prime ministerial candidate. The assassin diverts suspicion to a local assassin with political connections, who is then promptly killed by a corrupt policeman. Salinger and Whitman get a lead on the second assassin, but the policeman confronts the two and orders them out of the country. At the airport, they are able to check the security camera footage for clues on the whereabouts of the bank's assassin, and follow a suspect to New York City.

In New York, Salinger and Whitman are met by two New York Police Department (NYPD) detectives, Iggy Ornelas and Bernie Ward, who have a photograph of the assassin's face. Salinger, Ornelas, and Ward locate Dr. Isaacson to whose practice the assassin's leg brace has been traced, and they are able to follow him to the Solomon R. Guggenheim Museum.

Jonas Skarssen, the chairman of the IBBC, reveals to his lawyer White and security adviser Wexler that Calvini was killed so that they could have his sons buy missile guidance systems in which the bank has invested. Since the bank knows that Salinger and Whitman are close to finding their assassin, they send a team of hitmen to kill him, while Wexler is arrested by Ornelas. As Salinger and Ward speak to the assassin and attempt to arrest him, a shootout at the Guggenheim erupts when a number of gunmen attack them. Ward is killed in the chaos, and Salinger is forced to team up with the assassin to fight off the gunmen. However, the assassin is mortally wounded during their escape and dies of his injuries.

When Salinger goes to interrogate Wexler, a veteran Stasi officer, the latter reveals that the IBBC is practically untouchable due to its connections to terrorist organizations, drug cartels, governments, and powerful corporations, though Wexler indicates a willingness to help Salinger take down the IBBC. Meanwhile, Salinger persuades Whitman to let him continue alone.

In Italy, Salinger tells Calvini's sons of the IBBC's responsibility for their father's murder, prompting them to cancel the deal with the bank and order White to be killed. Salinger then accompanies Wexler to Istanbul, where Skarssen is buying the guidance systems from their only other manufacturer, Ahmet Sunay. Salinger attempts to record the conversation so that he can obstruct the deal by proving to the buyers that the missiles will be useless, but he ultimately fails. Both Wexler and Skarssen are then killed by a hitman contracted by the Calvinis to avenge their father's murder. Salinger is left stunned, his investigation, pursuit, and determination to bring down the IBBC having led to nothing.

Afterwards, the bank successfully continues its operations despite the death of Skarssen, as he had predicted to Salinger before he was killed. However, with the new and more aggressive chairman, the IBBC's increased expansion and aggression ultimately lead to greater scrutiny, leading to a United States Senate investigation headed by Whitman.

Cast

 Clive Owen as Louis Salinger
 Naomi Watts as Eleanor Whitman
 Armin Mueller-Stahl as Wilhelm Wexler
 Ulrich Thomsen as Jonas Skarssen
 Michel Voletti as Viktor Haas
 Patrick Baladi as Martin White
 Jay Villiers as Francis Ehames
 Fabrice Scott as Nicolai Yeshinski
 Haluk Bilginer as Ahmet Sunay
 Luca Barbareschi as Umberto Calvini
 Alessandro Fabrizi as Inspector Alberto Cerutti
 Axel Milberg as Klaus Diemer
 Brían F. O'Byrne as "The Consultant", the bank's assassin
 Felix Solis as Detective Iggy Ornelas
 Jack McGee as Detective Bernie Ward
 Nilaja Sun as Detective Gloria Hubbard
 Steven Randazzo as Al Moody
 Tibor Feldman as Dr. Isaacson
 James Rebhorn as New York D.A.
 Remy Auberjonois as Sam Purvitz
 Ian Burfield as Thomas Schumer
 Ben Whishaw as Rene Antall

Production
The screenplay was written by Eric Warren Singer after he developed an interest in the banking scandals from the 1980s and 90s. He was looking for "a paranoid thriller vibe" from that period; "The Godfather III was really the only film up to this point that dealt with the banking scandals, because it was really gangster warfare on a corporate level, and I thought that was the best part of the film." Later reviewers compared it directly to The Parallax View (1974) and All The President's Men (1976). A year later Tom Tykwer got involved through his agent, but decided a contemporary setting would work better. In April 2007, Clive Owen agreed to perform in The International. He said the script interested him because he was reminded of "those '70s paranoia pictures" and because it combined a factual, intelligent basis with an international thriller plot. The following July, actress Naomi Watts was cast opposite Owen. In August, the film received US$5.4 million from the  toward its budget. The following month its funding increased to $7.9 million, based on the board's assessment that two-thirds of The International would be produced in Germany and that a number of Germans were in important roles, such as actors Armin Mueller-Stahl and Axel Milberg, cinematographer Frank Griebe, and production designer Uli Hanisch. Filming began in Berlin on 10 September 2007. Part of the production took place in Babelsberg Studios.

Clive Owen called the shoot-out scene "one of the most exquisitely executed sequences I've been involved in". Tom Tykwer planned the scene in detail and toured the museum with the principals months in advance. This set was too large for the studio, so it was instead built in a disused locomotive warehouse outside Berlin; its construction took ten weeks. Having filmed in the real museum interior and on the sound stage in Germany, the film crew had to track the lights and camera angles carefully throughout to ensure continuity. The scene includes a sequence in which the protagonist sends a huge art-chandelier hanging from the ceiling crashing to the ground; the entire stunt was created using computer generated imagery.

Themes
Clive Owen, discussing the film's relevance, said it "ultimately does ask questions about whether banks use people's money appropriately, and if they're completely sound institutions." More boldly put, Philip French, reviewing the film in The Observer, surmised the sentiment as "Let's kill all the bankers", a modern-day version of Dick the Butcher's "First thing we do, let's kill all the lawyers", from Shakespeare's Henry VI, Part II. Salinger's (Owen) central revelation is that the world is governed by anonymous forces, staffed by disposable individuals. The powerlessness of the ordinary citizen is symbolised by the huge, impersonal buildings that the villains inhabit.

The film draws on a number of macabre incidents from international banking: the Bank of Credit and Commerce International crisis in 1991; the murder of Roberto Calvi, an alleged banker to the Sicilian Mafia, in London in 1982; and the assassination by poisoning of Georgi Markov in London, in 1978. The bank is making large loans to rogue states and simultaneously acting as their munitions broker. The script offers the chilling insight that the creditors are the real winners of any conflict. A.O. Scott commented on the opportunity to make a film critical of international finance, "that multinational weapons manufacturers can be portrayed as more decent, civic-minded and principled than global financiers surely says something about the state of the world."

Home Media
The International was released on DVD,Blu-Ray and UMD Video on June 9 2009 by Sony Pictures Home Entertainment.

Reception

Box office
The International was first screened on 5 February 2009 at the 59th Berlin International Film Festival and was released in the United States and Canada on 13 February 2009. In a six-week run in America, it earned $25 million at the box office. It was released in Australia on 19 February and the United Kingdom on 27 February 2009. Its total theatrical earnings worldwide were $60,161,391.

It was released in France under the title "L'Enquête" ("The Investigation") on 11 March 2009, it earned €264,054 during a three-week theatrical release.

Reviewers called the film "topical" and "remarkably prescient", due to its release just after the financial crisis of 2007–08 during the start of the Great Recession. The film was released on DVD and Blu-ray in the United States on 9 June 2009. It contains a digital copy for portable devices.

Critical reception
, the film holds a 58% approval rating on Rotten Tomatoes based on 213 reviews and an average rating of 5.80/10. The consensus statement reads: "The International boasts some electric action sequences and picturesque locales, but is undone by its preposterous plot." Metacritic gives the film a 52% rating based on 34 reviews.

In his review for The Guardian, Peter Bradshaw wrote, "I felt occasionally that Owen's rumpled performance is in danger of becoming a little one-note ... but this is still an unexpectedly well–made thriller with brainpower as well as firepower". Philip French, in his review for The Observer, called the film a "slick, fast-moving conspiracy thriller" and the gunfight in the Guggenheim "spectacular". In his review for The Independent, Anthony Quinn wrote, "It's reasonably efficient, passably entertaining, and strenuously playing catch-up with the Bourne movies: flat-footed Owen doesn't look as good as Matt Damon sprinting through city streets, and the editing doesn't match Doug Liman's whiplash pace". The New Yorker magazine's David Denby wrote, "And there's a big hole in the middle of the movie: the director, Tom Tykwer, and the screenwriter, Eric Warren Singer, forgot to make their two crusaders human beings". In his review for The New York Post, Lou Lumenick wrote, "There, an anticlimactic rooftop chase reminds us that Tykwer, the German director who reinvented the Euro thriller with Run, Lola, Run a decade ago, has been far surpassed by Doug Liman and the Bourne adventures, yet thankfully lacking the rampant and nonsensical roller-coaster style of editing, where no shot lingers for longer than a nano-second.". A.O. Scott, in his review for The New York Times, wrote, "The International, in contrast, is so undistinguished that the moments you remember best are those that you wish another, more original director had tackled".
In his review for the Los Angeles Times, Kenneth Turan wrote, "It's got some effective moments and aspects, but the film goes in and out of plausibility, and its elements never manage to unify into a coherent whole". Claudia Puig, in her review for USA Today, wrote, "The dialogue by screenwriter Eric Warren Singer is spotty. There are some great, pithy lines and others whose attempt at profundity ring false". Roger Ebert gave the film three out of four stars and wrote, "Clive Owen makes a semi-believable hero, not performing too many feats that are physically unlikely. He's handsome and has the obligatory macho stubble, but he has a quality that makes you worry a little about him". Entertainment Weekly gave the film a "B−" rating and Lisa Schwarzbaum wrote, "the star of the pic may well be NYC's Guggenheim Museum and Istanbul's Grand Bazaar, both of which figure in cool action chase sequences that pay handsome dividends".

The film earned an average rating of three stars from five from French critics according to AlloCiné. Reviewing the film for Le Monde, which gave the film one star, Jacques Mandelbaum said that the modern, destructive forces of political fantasy and derivative finance which power the film's plot should have created sparks, "but in reality, the film trudges along. While the film constituted a thrilling geographic tour of the genre tropes, it forgot to focus on characters and mood."

References

External links

 
 
 
 
 
 

2009 films
2009 action drama films
2009 action thriller films
2000s political thriller films
American action drama films
American action thriller films
American political thriller films
English-language German films
German action drama films
German action thriller films
German political thriller films
2000s Danish-language films
2000s English-language films
2000s French-language films
2000s Italian-language films
Films about Interpol
Films set in Berlin
Films set in Istanbul
Films set in Lyon
Films set in Luxembourg
Films set in Milan
Films set in New York City
Films shot in Istanbul
Atlas Entertainment films
Babelsberg Studio films
Columbia Pictures films
Relativity Media films
Films directed by Tom Tykwer
Films produced by Charles Roven
Films produced by Richard Suckle
Films scored by Tom Tykwer
Films scored by Reinhold Heil
Films scored by Johnny Klimek
2009 action films
Films set in museums
2009 multilingual films
American multilingual films
German multilingual films
2000s American films
2000s German films